Terror at Tenkiller is a 1986 American slasher film directed and produced by Ken Meyer, and written by Claudia Meyer. The film was shot entirely in Oklahoma near Lake Fort Gibson and the Fort Gibson dam, though not at the actual Tenkiller Ferry Lake as the story suggests.

Plot 
In rural Oklahoma, under the cover of night, a marina worker named Tor murders Denise, a local waitress, by slitting her throat, then dumps her body in Lake Tenkiller.

The next day, a pair of co-eds, Leslie and Janna, head to Janna's summer home near Lake Tenkiller for summer break, and to get away from Leslie's abusive fiancé, Josh. At the lake, the two get summer jobs at the diner where Denise worked during previous summers. They meet Tor, who takes an instant liking to Leslie. Shortly after Leslie and Janna's arrival, Tor stabs another waitress, Debbie, to death in a hot tub. He also knifes and dismembers his lecherous boss, Preacher, outside of Janna's place, after catching him spying on the women. After a while, both Leslie and Janna grow to trust and like Tor and offer him to come to their cabin for a beer. By this time, the two women have received threatening voicemails on their cabin's phone and assume it's Josh. They pay little mind to it and continue life as usual. Later on, Janna goes out to tan on the dock while Leslie is working the closing shift alone at the diner. Tor visits Janna and Leslie's cabin for a beer and murders Janna by stabbing her in the back as she's washing her hair. Meanwhile, Josh is looking at maps, making phone calls, and chain smoking presumably trying to locate Leslie.

When Leslie returns home from work, she finds Janna's body and believes that it was Josh who killed her. Tor consoles Leslie and soon plays a harmonica and admits that he was the one who killed Janna because he believed that she was a corrupting influence on Leslie. Tor then begins to tell her how much he loves her. Leslie runs off into the wilderness after slashing him across the face with a car key while he professes his love for her. While chasing Leslie, Tor hears Josh's car pull up, and murders him by slashing his throat, leaving his corpse propped up in a room for Leslie to find when she returns to the house. Knocking Leslie out when she finds Josh's body, Tor places her in his boat and starts rowing across the lake, but is knocked overboard and seemingly drowns when Leslie awakens and swims to shore. Narration by Leslie comments that the police were never able to discern who her attacker really was or where he came from. In the last shot of the film, Tor is shown leaping out of the water and the image freezes as the credits roll.

Cast 
 Stacey Logan as Leslie
 Michelle Merchant as Janna McKinney
 Michael Shamus Wiles as Tor
 Kevin Meyer as Josh
 Dale Buckmaster as Preacher
 Debbie Killion as Debbie (Waitress)
 Dean Lewis as Charlie
 Jill Holmes as Denise

Release

Home media
Terror at Tenkiller was released on VHS and Betamax by United Home Video in 1986. A DVD was released in 2004 by VCI Home Video, as a part of a double feature with the 1987 film The Last Slumber Party.

Terror at Tenkiller with a humorous mocking commentary by Mike Nelson, Kevin Murphy and Bill Corbett of Mystery Science Theater 3000 fame was released as a purchasable download (Video on Demand) by RiffTrax on March 28, 2014.

References

External links 
 
 The Betamax Rundown:  Terror at Tenkiller (1986)

1986 films
1986 horror films
1980s slasher films
American serial killer films
Films set in Oklahoma
Films shot in Oklahoma
Direct-to-video horror films
American slasher films
1980s English-language films
1980s American films